Jennifer Capriati was the defending champion, but lost in semifinals to Patty Schnyder

Iva Majoli won the title, defeating Schnyder in the final 7–6(7–5), 6–4. It was the first since becoming the Grand Slam champion in 1997, the 8th and last title of Majoli's career.

Seeds
The first nine seeds received a bye into the second round.

Draw

Finals

Top half

Section 1

Section 2

Bottom half

Section 3

Section 4

References
 Main and Qualifying draws

Family Circle Cup
Charleston Open